Ghaghar Burhi (Bengali: ঘাঘর বুড়ি, Hindi: घाघर बुढ़ी) is in Asansol city, by the side of the National Highway (Bypass) in West Bengal, India. It is a small shrine dedicated to Goddess Kali. It is the oldest temple of Asansol. Worship is held every Tuesday and Saturday. A country fair is held on 15 January every year. Animals are sacrificed as part of worship.

Overview
Legend has it that a marriage procession was unable to cross the rivulet in spate. They worshipped the deity, and the water subsided.  They crossed the rivulet safely. But the king promised to give head of two goats for this but as he passed they forgot their promise Goddess curse them and all were inside the water still it can be seen according to the old people saying (The rivulet now acts as sewage drainage of Asansol City. There are boulders and uneven stones, which gives rise to a strong current and eddy. This otherwise narrow and small rivulet is dangerous to cross.).

Kali temples
Hindu temples in West Bengal
Buildings and structures in Paschim Bardhaman district
Asansol